Broons (Gallo: Bron) is a commune in the Côtes-d'Armor department in Brittany in northwestern France.

International relations
Broons is twinned with the town Neufahrn i.NB in Bavaria since 1971.

Population

Inhabitants of Broons are called Broonais in French.

Heraldry 

{{Blazon-arms
| img1=COA fr Broons (Côtes-d'Armor).svg
| legend1= Arms of Broons, derived from the arms of Bertrand du Guesclin
| description=D'argent à une aigle bicéphale éployée de sable, becquée et armée de gueules, et une cotice brochant en bande de gueules.
| text=The current Arms of Broons, derived from the arms of Bertrand du Guesclin:<ref>Selon Le Patrimoine des Communes du Pays Sud de Dinan</ref>Argent a double-headed eagle displayed Sable beaked and armed Gules, overall a bendlet Gules.}}

 Blazon: Azure a cross Argent fretty Gules.''

Personalities

 Bertrand du Guesclin, French knight and constable of France during the Hundred Years' War, born in Broons in 1320.
 Olivier de Clisson, French knight and constable of France.

See also
Communes of the Côtes-d'Armor department

References

External links

Official website 

Communes of Côtes-d'Armor